Santa Marta is a former Roman Catholic church, now deconsecrated, in Ivrea, Province of Turin, region of Piedmont, Italy.

History 
The church was initially built in the late 15th-century but rebuilt at the end of the 16th century by the Confraternity of Santa Marta, a confraternity of disciplinanti (or flagellants). To the right of the entrance, they built an oratory.

Of the original decoration only one altar remains, and traces of frescoes in the presbytery and some lunettes in the walls of the oratory. Deconsecrated after World War Two, it became the property of the Commune of Ivrea in the 1970s, who converted it into a conference hall. The Baroque portal was moved to the parish church of San Bernardino in Ivrea.

References 

Roman Catholic churches in Ivrea
Baroque architecture in Piedmont
18th-century Roman Catholic church buildings in Italy